Thomas Evans (3 June 1852 – 2 December 1916) was an English first-class cricketer who played for Derbyshire in 1883.

Evans was born in Stoneyford, Derbyshire.  He made his debut for Derbyshire in the 1883 season in the year after his brother Henry Evans stopped playing for the club. His first match was against the Marylebone Cricket Club (MCC). He played one more match for Derbyshire, but from his two games achieved the top batting average for the club in the season.

Evans later played for Liverpool and District. He played during a Canadian tour of England in 1887 and took eleven wickets in the match. He played two first-class matches for Liverpool and District, his last in 1889 against Nottinghamshire.

Evans was a right-handed batsman and played four first-class matches with an average of 13.00 and a top score of 35. He was a right-arm slow-medium bowler and took 6 first-class wickets at an average of 25.00 and a best performance of 2 for 27.

Evans died in Heaton Moor, Lancashire.

References

1852 births
1916 deaths
English cricketers
Derbyshire cricketers
Liverpool and District cricketers
People from Amber Valley
Cricketers from Derbyshire